William Norman Colvin (December 3, 1934 – November 3, 2010) was a Canadian ice hockey player who competed in the 1956 Winter Olympics.

Colvin was a member of the Kitchener-Waterloo Dutchmen who won the bronze medal for Canada in ice hockey at the 1956 Winter Olympics.

Following his hockey playing days, Colvin, who had been a teacher, then became a lawyer and practiced law for over 30 years.

References

External links

Bill Colvin's profile at Sports Reference.com

1934 births
2010 deaths
Ice hockey people from Toronto
Medalists at the 1956 Winter Olympics
Olympic ice hockey players of Canada
Olympic bronze medalists for Canada
Ice hockey players at the 1956 Winter Olympics
Canadian ice hockey left wingers